Andrew Peacock is a Canadian author and retired veterinarian residing in Freshwater-Carbonear, Newfoundland. His debut book, Creatures of the Rock: A Veterinarian's Adventures in Newfoundland was long-listed for the 2015 Leacock Medal for Humour and won the 2015 Newfoundland Book Award.

Life 
Peacock was born in Toronto and raised in Kapuskasing, Ontario. He moved from Ontario to Newfoundland in 1982 after graduating from the University of Guelph as a doctor of veterinary medicine. Peacock practiced as a mixed animal veterinarian in rural Newfoundland from 1982 to 2010. After retiring from veterinary practice, he wrote two books, both of which are inspired by his time as a veterinarian. He also previously owned an independent bookstore in Carbonear called "Waterwords" with his wife.  Along with his literary career, Peacock works for the Newfoundland and Labrador College of Veterinarians.

Works 
 Creatures of the Rock (2014)
 One Brave Boy and His Cat (2019)

Awards 
 2015 Leacock Medal for Humour (long-listed) for Creatures of the Rock
 2015 Newfoundland and Labrador Book Awards (won) for Creatures of the Rock

References 

21st-century Canadian novelists
Writers from Newfoundland and Labrador
Living people
Year of birth missing (living people)